Bromism is the syndrome which results from the long-term consumption of bromine, usually through bromine-based sedatives such as potassium bromide and lithium bromide. Bromism was once a very common disorder, being responsible for 5 to 10% of psychiatric hospital admissions, but is now uncommon since bromide was withdrawn from clinical use in many countries and was severely restricted in others.

Presentation

Neurological and psychiatric
Neurological and psychiatric symptoms are widely varied and may include the symptoms of restlessness, irritability, ataxia, confusion, hallucinations, psychosis, weakness, stupor and, in severe cases, coma.

Gastrointestinal
Gastrointestinal effects include nausea and vomiting as acute adverse effects and anorexia and constipation with chronic use.

Dermatological
Dermatological effects include cherry angiomas, acneiform, pustular and erythematous rashes.

Cause
High levels of bromide chronically impair the membrane of neurons, which progressively impairs neuronal transmission, leading to toxicity, known as bromism. Bromide has an elimination half-life of 9 to 12 days, which can lead to excessive accumulation. Doses of 0.5 to 1 gram per day of bromide can lead to bromism. Historically, the therapeutic dose of bromide is about 3 to 5 grams of bromide, thus explaining why chronic toxicity (bromism) was once so common. While significant and sometimes serious disturbances occur to neurologic, psychiatric, dermatological, and gastrointestinal functions, death is rare from bromism.

Bromism is caused by a neurotoxic effect on the brain which results in somnolence, psychosis, seizures and delirium.  Bromism has also been caused by excessive soda consumption, due to the presence of brominated vegetable oil, leading to headache, fatigue, ataxia, memory loss, and potentially the inability to walk as observed in one case.

Diagnosis
Bromism is diagnosed by checking the serum chloride level, electrolytes, glucose, BUN and creatinine, as well as symptoms such as psychosis. Bromine is also radiopaque, so an abdominal X-ray may also help in the diagnosis.

Treatment

There are no specific antidotes or protocols for bromide poisoning of the body. Increased intake of regular salt and water, which increases the flow of the related chloride ion through the body, is one way of flushing out the bromide. Furosemide may help aid urinary excretion in individuals with renal impairment or where bromide toxicity is severe.  In one case, hemodialysis was used to reduce bromide's half-life to 1.38h, dramatically improving the patient's condition.

Iodine deficiency is also linked to weaker (less detectable) forms of bromism. Iodine and bromine are closely related to each other in behavior and thus location on the periodic table, and high levels of bromine will displace iodine in tissues and blood when there is an opportunity to do so. Supplementary intake of iodine should be preceded by a salt loading protocol, or consumption of dietary sulfur beforehand.

References

External links 

Neurological disorders
Substance-related disorders
Toxic effects of dietary elements
Syndromes affecting the nervous system
Syndromes affecting the gastrointestinal tract
Syndromes affecting the skin